Fundulopanchax avichang is a species of African killifish that mainly inhabits small temporary pools of the Ecucu River drainage systems. The species is endemic to Equatorial Guinea. Breeding pairs of the species most often lay their eggs over the bottom, but occasionally also among the roots of free-floating aquatic plants. Pairs stay close for some time, with just a few eggs being produced each day.

References 

avichang
Fish of Equatorial Guinea
Endemic fauna of Equatorial Guinea
Fish described in 1970